The following is a non-exhaustive list of standardized tests that assess a person's language proficiency of a foreign/secondary language. Various types of such exams exist per many languages—some are organized at an international level even through national authoritative organizations, while others simply for specific limited business or study orientation.

Afrikaans
 Official ACTFL Oral Proficiency Interview (OPI)

Akan-Twi
 Official ACTFL Oral Proficiency Interview (OPI)

Albanian
 The Foreign Language Achievement Testing Service at Brigham Young University offer both BYU and non-BYU students the opportunity to test their ability in the language
 ACTFL Oral Proficiency Interview (OPI)
 University of Tirana offers its own levels A1-C2. Exams are held on the last Friday of every month, except July, August and December.

American Sign Language
 ASLPI American Sign Language Proficiency Interview
SLPI Sign Language Proficiency Interview

Amharic
 Official ACTFL Oral Proficiency Interview (OPI)
 Avant Amharic WorldSpeak Test  is a monolingual language proficiency test created for Amharic language learners to meet the growing need for heritage language communities to have rigorous, professionally scored, and affordable assessments based on the ACTFL Proficiency Guidelines.

Armenian
 The Foreign Language Achievement Testing Service at Brigham Young University offers both BYU and non-BYU students the opportunity to test their ability in the language
 Official ACTFL Oral Proficiency Interview (OPI)

Arabic
 The Arabic Language Proficiency Test (ALPT) is a standardized Arabic proficiency test designed by Arabic Academy and endorsed by the Islamic Chamber of Commerce and Industry (ICCI). There are 56 member countries under ICCI that cover all 22 Arab countries as well as 34 countries in Africa and the Far East. The ALPT started in 2002 and measures the student's level of proficiency in Arabic. The ALPT has five sections: Listening Comprehension, Reading, Structure, Writing, Speaking.
 Berlitz Language Institutes offer a competency test in reading, writing, speaking & listening assessing the proficiency in the Arabic language according to the CEFR benchmark.
 Eton Institute offers its own "Arabic Language Competency Test" (ALCT), a 4-skills (reading, writing, speaking, listening) exam which generates a band-score result similar to the IELTS model, but for Arabic.
 The AL-ARABIYYA-TEST by the AL-ARABIYYA-INSTITUTE, is an Arabic language proficiency test conducted online that measures a learner's level according to the CEFR benchmark.
 ACTFL OPIc
 CIMA (Certificat International de Maîtrise en Arabe) is a standardized Arabic proficiency test developed by the Institut du Monde Arabe in Paris, and is offered since 2018 in Paris (at the institute) and in several accredited centres around the world.
 Avant Arabic Proficiency Test (APT)  is a monolingual language proficiency test in Modern Standard Arabic (MSA) created for native Arabic Speakers who need to function effectively in the Arabic speaking world.
 ILA - Certificazione Lingua Araba. Arabic proficiency test of the 'Centro Studi' of Milan (Italy).

Azerbaijani (Azeri)
 Official ACTFL Oral Proficiency Interview (OPI)

Balochi
 Official ACTFL Oral Proficiency Interview (OPI)

Bengali
 Official ACTFL Oral Proficiency Interview (OPI)

Brazilian Sign Language
ProLibras - Brazilian Sign Language Certificate
ProLibras - Certificação em língua brasileira de sinais (libras)

British Sign Language
Signature - British Sign Language Certificate Levels 1-6
iBSL - British Sign Language Certificate Levels 1-6
Scottish Qualifications Authority - British Sign Language Certificate Levels 1–6, along with other related qualifications.

Bosnian 
 Official ACTFL Oral Proficiency Interview (OPI)

Bulgarian
The Standard Test of Bulgarian as a Foreign Language 
(STBFL) (Стандартизиран тест по 
български език като чужд език (СТБЕЧ))
ECL - European Consortium for the Certificate of Attainment in Modern Languages
 Official ACTFL Oral Proficiency Interview (OPI)

Cambodian (Khmer)
 The Foreign Language Achievement Testing Service at Brigham Young University offer both BYU and non-BYU students the opportunity to test their ability in the language by a non-repeatable 144-question exam, the so-called Khmer Exemption Exam
 Official ACTFL Oral Proficiency Interview (OPI)

Catalan
Certificats de català - Institut Ramon Llull. Valid in most Catalan-speaking territories, usually the first option in Catalonia.
 Nivell bàsic (A2)
 Nivell elemental (B1)
 Nivell intermedi (B2)
 Nivell de suficiència (C1)
 Nivell superior (C2)
Certificats de valencià - Junta Qualificadora de Coneixements de Valencià. Valid in most Catalan-speaking territories, usually the first option in Valencia.
 Nivell A2
 Nivell B1
 Grau mitjà (C1)
 Grau superior (C2)
Certificats de català - Direcció General de Política Lingüística del Govern Balear. Valid in most Catalan-speaking territories, usually the first option in the Balearic Islands.
 Nivell A2
 Nivell B1
 Nivell B2
 Nivell C1
 Nivell C2

Cebuano
 Official ACTFL Oral Proficiency Interview (OPI)
 The Foreign Language Achievement Testing Service at Brigham Young University offer both BYU and non-BYU students the opportunity to test their ability in the language

Chinese

Mandarin
HSK - Hanyu Shuiping Kaoshi. Official test of Mandarin in mainland China, consisting of reading, writing, listening and comprehension
HSKK - HSK Speaking Test. HSKK assesses the test takers’ oral Chinese abilities. HSKK consists of three levels, HSKK (Primary level), HSKK (Intermediate level) and HSKK (Advanced level). HSKK is conducted in the form of audio recording.
TOCFL - Test of Chinese as a Foreign Language. Test used in Taiwan for Mandarin as a foreign language.
 ILCE CEFR Exam System:
 ILCE Chinese A0+ CEFR
 ILCE Chinese A1 / A2 CEFR
 ILCE Chinese A1 / A2 / B1 / B2 CEFR
 ILCE Chinese A1 / A2 CEFR only speaking
 ILCE Chinese A2 / A2+ / B1 / B1+ / B2 CEFR only speaking
 ILCE Chinese A1 / A2 CEFR only writing
 ILCE Chinese A2 / A2+ / B1 / B1+ / B2 CEFR only writing
 ILCE Chinese A1 / A2 CEFR only listening
 ILCE Chinese A2 / A2+ / B1 / B1+ / B2 CEFR only listening
 ILCE Chinese Tourism and Hotel Sector A1 / A2 / B1 / B2 CEFR
 ACTFL OPIc
 Certificados en Lenguas Extranjeras (CLE). Certificate of proficiency in six foreign languages, Mandarin Chinese being one of them, issued by the Ministry of Education, City of Buenos Aires (Argentina). Tests the four skills. Targeted at primary and secondary-level students in the City of BA, for whom it is free of charge.
 TSC - Test of Spoken Chinese was conducted under the leadership of YBM, the largest language institute in Korea. Most large South Korean companies now require Chinese employees to pass the TSC.
 BCT - Business Chinese Test, as an international, standardized test of Chinese language proficiency, focuses on assessing non-native Chinese speakers’ abilities to use the Chinese language in real business or common working environments and evaluating the language tasks they are able to complete. The BCT, as a test series, consists of three independent tests: BCT (A), BCT (B) and the BCT Speaking Test.

Cantonese
 Avant STAMP and STAMP Pro Cantonese adaptive assessments utilize actual cultural texts and audio you would encounter in the real world such as articles, advertisements, and news. All Avant Cantonese proficiency tests are aligned to the ACTFL Proficiency Guidelines.
Certificate in Chinese Language - University of Hong Kong
 First Examination
 Certificate Examination
 Computerized Oral Proficiency Assessment (COPA) - assessment of oral and comprehension skills only
 Diploma Programme in Chinese as a Foreign/Second Language (Cantonese) - Chinese University of Hong Kong; levels: Foundation, Certificate, Diploma, Advanced
 Official ACTFL Oral Proficiency Interview (OPI)

Hokkien
 MSC - Minnanhua Shuiping Ceshi. This is the first, and the only one for now, official standardized test of a variety of Chinese other than Mandarin in mainland China. It is a speaking test with four parts: reading out words, sentences, a passage and speaking on a topic. There is no preferred dialect of Hokkien for the test; any dialect may be used as long as the pronunciation is proper in that dialect. The first test was held in Xiamen on 19 November 2016 to select future examiners, and so it was only for people in the education, broadcasting and cultural sectors who have received prior trainings. The first test open to the public was held on 9 and 10 December 2017 in Xiamen and a free 2-day pre-test training was provided to test-takers.

Taiwanese Hokkien
 General Taiwanese Proficiency Test (GTPT) is a standardized proficiency test for speakers of Taiwanese designed by the Center for Taiwanese Languages Testing at National Cheng Kung University, Tainan, Taiwan. In addition to GTPT, there is another International Taiwanese Proficiency Test (ITPT) for speakers of Taiwanese as a second language.

Czech
 CCE - Czech Language Certificate Exam
 ECL - European Consortium for the Certificate of Attainment in Modern Languages

Danish
 CLAVIS Danish Language Proficiency Test
 Official ACTFL Oral Proficiency Interview (OPI)

Dari
 Official ACTFL Oral Proficiency Interview (OPI)

Dutch
Nederlands als Tweede Taal (Dutch as a second language, abbreviated NT2). A two-part examination required in the Netherlands to study at the tertiary level. Part I is less thorough than II. Successful completion gains a NT2-I or NT2-II diploma
Certificaat Nederlands als vreemde taal (CNavT). A set of six exams, each aimed at confirming proficiency for specific fields. "Profile Tourist and Informal Language Proficiency (PTIT)" is equal to ECF A2, and "Profile Language Proficiency Higher Education" is equal to ECF B2 (both are accepted by most higher-level education institutions in Belgium and the Netherlands).
 Official ACTFL Oral Proficiency Interview (OPI)

English

Accepted Test Types per Immigration

AUS: Australia Immigration
CAN: Canada Immigration
 GBR: United Kingdom Immigration
 NZL: New Zealand Immigration  offers over half-dozen categories of visa types that relate to specific test types and scores.
 USA: For United States Immigration, Cambridge observes that:  "Unlike Australia, Canada and the UK, if you want to work or study in the USA you do not need to fulfil an English language requirement for your visa. However, you may need to prove your level of English when applying for college or employment. Cambridge English certificates are often used for this purpose."  Each individual educational institution must be researched on any proficiency test requirement, since, for example, the Graduate School at Texas Tech University exemplifies this matter by having published  its own list of so-called "English Proficiency-Exempt Countries"—whose citizens do not need to pass one of these proficiency tests when they seek admission into TTU.
 ZAF: South Africa Immigration

List of Identified Tests
 ACTFL TEP - ACTFL Test of English Proficiency
 AMIR - English Proficiency Test for Higher Education in Israel
 Anglolinguist Language Certificate
Avant STAMP, STAMP Pro, and STAMP WS adaptive English assessments utilize actual cultural texts and audio you would encounter in the real world such as articles, advertisements, and news. All Avant English proficiency tests are aligned to the ACTFL Proficiency Guidelines.
Babbel English Test powered by Cambridge English
 Berlitz Telelangue Language Audit
 Berlitz GTEC English Language Assessment
 CAL BEST Literacy
 CAL BEST Plus 2.0
 CAL English Proficiency Test for Teachers (CAL EPT Teachers)
 CAL English Proficiency Test for Students (CAL EPT Students)
 CAL English Proficiency Test: Diagnostic for Students (CAL EPT Diagnostic
 UCELA - University of Cambridge English Language Assessment 
 A2 Key - UCELA (University of Cambridge English Language Assessment)
 B1 Preliminary - UCELA (University of Cambridge English Language Assessment)
 B2 First - UCELA (University of Cambridge English Language Assessment)
 C1 Advanced - UCELA (University of Cambridge English Language Assessment)
 C2 Proficiency - UCELA (University of Cambridge English Language Assessment)
 Cambridge English: Young Learners (YLE) tests - UCELA (University of Cambridge English Language Assessment)
 CaMLA ECCE (The Examination for the Certificate of Competency in English)
 CaMLA ECPE (The Examination for the Certificate of Proficiency in English)
 CaMLA EPT (CaMLA English Placement Test)
 CaMLA ITASA (International Teaching Assistant Speaking Assessment)
 CaMLA MELAB (The Michigan English Language Assessment Battery)
 CaMLA MET (The Michigan English Test)
 Canadian English Language Proficiency Index Program (CELPIP) – an English language proficiency test designated by Immigration, Refugees and Citizenship Canada (IRCC) for permanent resident status in Canada and Canadian citizenship.
 Certificados en Lenguas Extranjeras (CLE). Certificate of proficiency in six foreign languages, English being one of them, issued by the Ministry of Education, City of Buenos Aires (Argentina). Tests the four skills. Targeted at primary and secondary-level students in the City of BA, for whom it is free of charge.
 (CAEL) The Canadian Academic English Language Assessment 
 Duolingo English Test (DET) - Duolingo
 E3PT - English3 Proficiency Test
 E3J1 English Interview
 ECL - European Consortium for the Certificate of Attainment in Modern Languages 
 EF Standard English Test
 ELSA English Language Skills Assessment
 Euroexam International at CEFR levels A1 to C1
 EXAMAGRAM - Free On-line English testing
 FluentIQ Test Center - High degree of accuracy, low cost, and almost instant results. Available online via www.fluentiq.com
 Former ELPT - English Language Proficiency Test
 GEP - Global English Proficiency Exams - United Kingdom - Online and paper based English exams based on the CEFR. All four skills are tested, affordable, reliable and valid. A set of 8 exams for children, teens and adults.
 EIKEN - Eiken Foundation of Japan
 General Tests of English Language Proficiency (G-TELP)
IELPT - International English Language Proficiency Test
 IELTS - International English Language Testing System
 IELCA - International English Language Competency Assessment (www.lrnglobal.org)
 ILCE CEFR Exam System 
 ILCE English A1 CEFR
 ILCE English A1 / A2 CEFR
 ILCE English A2 CEFR
 ILCE English B1 CEFR
 ILCE English B1 / B2 CEFR
 ILCE English B2 CEFR
 ILCE English A1 / A2 / B1 / B2 CEFR
 ILCE English C1 CEFR
 ILCE English C1 / C2 CEFR
 ILCE English C2 CEFR
 ILCE English Tourism and Hotel Sector A1 / A2 / B1 / B2 / C1 CEFR
 ILCE English Gastronomy Sector A1 / A2 / B1 / B2 / C1 CEFR
 ILCE English Nursing Care A1 / A2 / B1 / B2 / C1 CEFR
 ILCE English Sport Sector A1 / A2 / B1 / B2 / C1 CEFR
 ILCE English Logistics Sector A1 / A2 / B1 / B2 / C1 CEFR
 ILCE English For Students in Uniformed Classes For Students of High School A1 / A2 / B1 / B2 CEFR
 iTEP - International Test of English Proficiency
 LanguageCert Entry Level Certificate in ESOL International (Entry 1) (Listening, Reading, Writing) (Preliminary A1)
LanguageCert Entry Level Certificate in ESOL International (Entry 1) (Speaking) (Preliminary A1)
LanguageCert Entry Level Certificate in ESOL International (Entry 2) (Listening, Reading, Writing) (Access A2)
LanguageCert Entry Level Certificate in ESOL International (Entry 2) (Speaking) (Access A2)
LanguageCert Entry Level Certificate in ESOL International (Entry 3) (Listening, Reading, Writing) (Achiever B1)
LanguageCert Entry Level Certificate in ESOL International (Entry 3) (Speaking) (Achiever B1)
LanguageCert Level 1 Certificate in ESOL International (Listening, Reading, Writing) (Communicator B2)
LanguageCert Level 1 Certificate in ESOL International (Speaking) (Communicator B2)
LanguageCert Level 2 Certificate in ESOL International (Listening, Reading, Writing) (Expert C1)
LanguageCert Level 2 Certificate in ESOL International (Speaking) (Expert C1)
LanguageCert Level 3 Certificate in ESOL International (Listening, Reading, Writing) (Mastery C2)
LanguageCert Level 3 Certificate in ESOL International (Speaking) (Mastery C2)
 LanguageCert Young Learners ESOL Certificate (Listening, Reading, Writing) (Fox)
LanguageCert Young Learners ESOL Certificate (Speaking) (Fox)
LanguageCert Young Learners ESOL Certificate (Listening, Reading, Writing) (Owl)
LanguageCert Young Learners ESOL Certificate (Speaking) (Owl)
 MHLE - Iran Ministry of Health Language Exam
 MSRT - Iran Ministry of Science, Research and Technology language exam (Also known as MCHE)
 MUET
TrueNorth Adaptive English Language Proficiency Assessment by Emmersion
Occupational English Test (OET) is specifically designed for healthcare professionals
 ACTFL OPIc
 Oxford Test of English (OTE) - Four skill online computer-adaptive test, CEFR A2, B1, and B2 
 PAPORA - On-line Accreditation of A1/A2 English Proficiency
 Path International Examinations - A1- CSPA / ASPA level I (speaking exam)
 Path International Examinations - A1 CSPA / ASPA level II (speaking exam)
 Path International Examinations - A1+ CSPA / ASPA level III (speaking exam)
 Path International Examinations - A1- Entry level (four-skill exam)
 Path International Examinations - A1 Access level (four-skill exam)
 Path International Examinations - A1+ Achiever level (four-skill exam)
 Path International Examinations - A2 Preliminary level (four-skill exam)
 Path International Examinations - A2+ Elementary level (four-skill exam)
 Path International Examinations - B1 Progress level (four-skill exam)
 Path International Examinations - B2 Competency level (four-skill exam)
 Path International Examinations - C1 First Class level (four-skill exam)
 Path International Examinations - C2 Expert level (four-skill exam)
 PTE Academic - On-line testing
 PTE General - A series of six exams from Pearson Language Assessments (formerly known as the London Tests of English)
 STEP EIKEN - Test in Practical English Proficiency (Japan)
 CET-4 and CET-6 - College English Test band 4 and band 6 (China)
 TEM-4 and TEM-8 - Test for English Majors band 4 and band 8 (China)
 PETS - Public English Test System (China)
 Test of English as a Functional Language (IIT Kanpur, India)
 TEPS - Test of English Proficiency (South Korea)
 TELC - The European Language Certificates
 TIEC - Test of International English Competency
 TOEFL - Test of English as a Foreign Language
 TOEIC - Test of English for International Communication
 TOLIMO - The Test of Language by the Iranian Measurement Organization
 TrackTest English Proficiency Test - Online English Assessment Center using six CEFR levels.
 TSE - Test of Spoken English
 Trinity College London ESOL
 TWE - Test of Written English
 UBELT - University of Bath English Language Test
 UKAE Exams

Esperanto
 CEFR certification for levels B1, B2, C1

Estonian
 Estonian Language Proficiency Examinations, a.k.a. Eesti keele tasemeeksamid  This exam is for those applying for Estonian citizenship, and/or in whose position, proof of a certain level of proficiency in the Estonian language is required.

Finnish
YKI exam 
The YKI system for National certificates of language proficiency is the Finnish government's official system for language proficiency testing. A YKI certificate can be used for many purposes, such as:applying for a job or a university, applying for Finnish citizenship (certificates in Finnish and Swedish), or demonstrating your language skills for an employer.

Various, Yleiset kielitutkinnot from Opetushallitus
 Official ACTFL Oral Proficiency Interview (OPI)

French

 Avant STAMP, STAMP Pro, Place, and Avant STAMP WS adaptive French assessments utilize actual cultural texts and audio you would encounter in the real world such as articles, advertisements, and news. All Avant French proficiency tests are aligned to the ACTFL Proficiency Guidelines.
TEF - Test d'évaluation du français
TCF - Test de connaissance du français
TFI - Test de français international
Diplôme d'études en langue française (DELF) - Levels: A1, A2, B1, B2.
Diplôme approfondi de langue française (DALF) - Levels: C1, C2.
Examens de langue française (Université Paris-Sorbonne IV) - Levels: B1, B2, C1, C2, C3
ECL - European Consortium for the Certificate of Attainment in Modern Languages
TELC - The European Language Certificates
 ACTFL OPIc
 ILCE CEFR Exam System
 ILCE French A0+ CEFR
 ILCE French A1 CEFR
 ILCE French A1 / A2 CEFR
 ILCE French A2 CEFR
 ILCE French B1 CEFR
 ILCE French B1 / B2 CEFR
 ILCE French B2 CEFR
 ILCE French A1 / A2 / B1 / B2 CEFR
 ILCE French C1 CEFR
 ILCE French C1 / C2 CEFR
 ILCE French C2 CEFR
 ILCE French A1 / A2 / B1 / B2 / C1 / C2 CEFR
 ILCE French A1 / A2 CEFR only speaking
 ILCE French A2 / A2+ / B1 / B1+ / B2 CEFR only speaking
 ILCE French B1 / B1+ / B2 / B2+ / C1 CEFR only speaking
 ILCE French B2 / B2+ / C1 / C1+ / C2 CEFR only speaking
 ILCE French A1 / A2 CEFR only writing
 ILCE French A2 / A2+ / B1 / B1+ / B2 CEFR only writing
 ILCE French B1 / B1+ / B2 / B2+ / C1 CEFR only writing
 ILCE French B2 / B2+ / C1 / C1+ / C2 CEFR only writing
 ILCE French A1 / A2 CEFR only listening
 ILCE French A2 / A2+ / B1 / B1+ / B2 CEFR only listening
 ILCE French B1 / B1+ / B2 / B2+ / C1 CEFR only listening
 ILCE French B2 / B2+ / C1 / C1+ / C2 CEFR only listening
 ILCE French Tourism and Hotel Sector A1 / A2 / B1 / B2 / C1 CEFR
 ILCE French Gastronomy Sector A1 / A2 / B1 / B2 / C1 CEFR
 Certificados en Lenguas Extranjeras (CLE). Certificate of proficiency in six foreign languages, French being one of them, issued by the Ministry of Education, City of Buenos Aires (Argentina). Tests the four skills. Targeted at primary and secondary-level students in the City of BA, for whom it is free of charge.

French Sign Language
 Le Diplôme de Compétence en Langue des Signes Française (DCL) (The French Sign Language Proficiency Diploma) is a national diploma that was created specifically for adults.

Ga
 Official ACTFL Oral Proficiency Interview (OPI)

Galician
CELGA - Certificado en lingua galega - Xunta de Galicia
 CELGA 1 (A2)
 CELGA 2 (B1)
 CELGA 3 (B2)
 CELGA 4 (C1)
 CELGA 5 (C2)

Georgian
 Official ACTFL Oral Proficiency Interview (OPI)
 LanguagesCert.com Georgian Language Certificate Test (GLCT) - "the LanguagesCert test uses: multiple-choice questions test, essay, video, where you’ll be asked to record a video response, file uploads."

German
Avant STAMP, STAMP Pro, and Place, adaptive German assessments utilize actual cultural texts and audio you would encounter in the real world such as articles, advertisements, and news. All Avant German proficiency tests are aligned to the ACTFL Proficiency Guidelines.
Deutsches Sprachdiplom Stufe I and II (DSD) - German as a foreign language
DSH - Deutsche Sprachprüfung für den Hochschulzugang
TestDaF - Test Deutsch als Fremdsprache

DSD II, DSH, and TestDaF are accepted by any university in Germany. They are officially recognised as university entrance qualifications. Other tests may be considered, but no guarantees are given. In other German-speaking countries the situation varies.

ZD - Zertifikat Deutsch
ZDfB - Zertifikat Deutsch für den Beruf
ÖSD (Österreichisches Sprachdiplom Deutsch) - Austrian German Diploma
ECL - European Consortium for the Certificate of Attainment in Modern Languages
 A1 level (Start Deutsch 1) from the Goethe-Institut
 A2 level (Start Deutsch 2) from the Goethe-Institut
 B1 level (Goethe-Zertifikat B1) from the Goethe-Institut
 B2 level (Goethe-Zertifikat B2) from the Goethe-Institut
 C1 level (Goethe-Zertifikat C1) from the Goethe-Institut
 C2 level (Großes Deutsches Sprachdiplom) from the Goethe-Institut
 ACTFL OPIc
 Certificados en Lenguas Extranjeras (CLE). Certificate of proficiency in six foreign languages, German being one of them, issued by the Ministry of Education, City of Buenos Aires (Argentina). Tests the four skills. Targeted at primary and secondary-level students in the City of BA, for whom it is free of charge.
 Euroexam International at CEFR levels A2 to C1
 ILCE CEFR Exam System
 ILCE German A0+ CEFR
 ILCE German A1 CEFR
 ILCE German A1 / A2 CEFR
 ILCE German A2 CEFR
 ILCE German B1 CEFR
 ILCE German B1 / B2 CEFR
 ILCE German B2 CEFR
 ILCE German A1 / A2 / B1 / B2 CEFR
 ILCE German C1 CEFR
 ILCE German C1 / C2 CEFR
 ILCE German C2 CEFR
 ILCE German A1 / A2 / B1 / B2 / C1 / C2 CEFR
 ILCE German A1 / A2 CEFR only speaking
 ILCE German A2 / A2+ / B1 / B1+ / B2 CEFR only speaking
 ILCE German B1 / B1+ / B2 / B2+ / C1 CEFR only speaking
 ILCE German B2 / B2+ / C1 / C1+ / C2 CEFR only speaking
 ILCE German A1 / A2 CEFR only writing
 ILCE German A2 / A2+ / B1 / B1+ / B2 CEFR only writing
 ILCE German B1 / B1+ / B2 / B2+ / C1 CEFR only writing
 ILCE German B2 / B2+ / C1 / C1+ / C2 CEFR only writing
 ILCE German A1 / A2 CEFR only listening
 ILCE German A2 / A2+ / B1 / B1+ / B2 CEFR only listening
 ILCE German B1 / B1+ / B2 / B2+ / C1 CEFR only listening
 ILCE German B2 / B2+ / C1 / C1+ / C2 CEFR only listening
 ILCE German Tourism and Hotel Sector A1 / A2 / B1 / B2 / C1 CEFR
 ILCE German Gastronomy Sector A1 / A2 / B1 / B2 / C1 CEFR
 ILCE German Nursing Care A1 / A2 / B1 / B2 / C1 CEFR
TELC - The European Language Certificates

Greek
KGP - State Certificate of Language Proficiency
Πιστοποίηση Ελληνομάθειας - Certification of Attainment in Greek (Administered by the Center for the Greek Language, in accordance with CEFRL)
 Official ACTFL Oral Proficiency Interview (OPI)
 Fairfax Public Schools offers proficiency testing in Greek for its own students

Gujarati
 Official ACTFL Oral Proficiency Interview (OPI)

Haitian Creole
 Official ACTFL Oral Proficiency Interview (OPI)

Hausa
 Official ACTFL Oral Proficiency Interview (OPI)

Hebrew
 Avant STAMP and STAMP Pro adaptive Hebrew assessments utilize actual cultural texts and audio you would encounter in the real world such as articles, advertisements, and news. All Avant Hebrew proficiency tests are aligned to the ACTFL Proficiency Guidelines.
The Hebrew Proficiency Test (YAEL) takes place in Israel and is taken by students who seek to demonstrate a sufficient knowledge of Hebrew for the sake of university admissions.
ECL - European Consortium for the Certificate of Attainment in Modern Languages.
Georgetown University offers proficiency testing in this language for its own students.
 Official ACTFL Oral Proficiency Interview (OPI)

Hiligaynon
 Official ACTFL Oral Proficiency Interview (OPI)

Hindi
 Avant STAMP and STAMP Pro adaptive Hindi assessments utilize actual cultural texts and audio you would encounter in the real world such as articles, advertisements, and news. All Avant Hindi proficiency tests are aligned to the ACTFL Proficiency Guidelines.
Kendriya Hindi Sansthan
 Official ACTFL Oral Proficiency Interview (OPI)
 Official ACTFL Assessment of Performance toward Proficiency in Languages (APPL)

Hmong-Mong
 Official ACTFL Oral Proficiency Interview (OPI)

Hungarian
ECL - European Consortium for the Certificate of Attainment in Modern Languages. The certificate examinations are staged on four levels of language proficiency according to the Common European Framework of Reference for Languages:
 A2 – beginner;
B1 – basic;
B2 – intermediate;
C1 – advanced.
 ELTE Hungarian Language Courses from complete beginner (A1) to proficiency levels (C2)
 ORIGO Egynyelvű vizsga (Hungarian-only exam) by Idegennyelvi Továbbkepző Központ levels B1, B2 and C1 recognized by the Hungarian State
 Official ACTFL Oral Proficiency Interview (OPI)

Igbo
 Official ACTFL Oral Proficiency Interview (OPI)

Ilocano
 Official ACTFL Oral Proficiency Interview (OPI)

Indonesian
 UKBI (Uji Kemahiran Berbahasa Indonesia) also called TOIFL (Test of Indonesian as a Foreign Language)
 BIPA (Bahasa Indonesia untuk Penutur Asing)
 Official ACTFL Oral Proficiency Interview (OPI)

Irish
 Teastas Eorpach na Gaeilge

Italian
According to the Ministero degli Esteri (Italian Foreign Affairs), there are four officials Italian certifications approved CLIQ (Certificato di Lingua Italiana di Qualità): CILS, CELI, PLIDA and .IT ROMA TRE
CILS (Qualification) - Certificazione di Italiano come Lingua Straniera
CELI - Certificato di Conoscenza della Lingua Italiana
 PLIDA - Certificazione Progetto Lingua Italiana Dante Alighieri
 .IT ROMA TRE - Certificazione dell'ITaliano come lingua straniera
TELC - The European Language Certificates
AIL (Qualification) - Accademia Italiana di Lingua, Diploma Elementare di Lingua Italiana DELI A1 A2, Diploma Intermedio di Lingua Italiana DILI B1 B2, Diploma Avanzato di Lingua Italiana DALI C1, C2, Diploma Commerciale di Lingua Italiana DILC B1 DALC C1
 ACTFL OPIc
Avant STAMP, STAMP Pro, and Place adaptive Italian assessments utilize actual cultural texts and audio you would encounter in the real world such as articles, advertisements, and news. All Avant Italian proficiency tests are aligned to the ACTFL Proficiency Guidelines.
 Certificados en Lenguas Extranjeras (CLE). Certificate of proficiency in six foreign languages, Italian being one of them, issued by the Ministry of Education, City of Buenos Aires (Argentina). Tests the four skills. Targeted at primary and secondary-level students in the City of BA, for whom it is free of charge.
 ILCE CEFR Exam System
 ILCE Italian A0+ CEFR
 ILCE Italian A1 CEFR
 ILCE Italian A1 / A2 CEFR
 ILCE Italian A2 CEFR
 ILCE Italian B1 / B2 CEFR
 ILCE Italian A1 / A2 / B1 / B2 CEFR
 ILCE Italian C1 / C2 CEFR
 ILCE Italian A1 / A2 / B1 / B2 / C1 / C2 CEFR
 ILCE Italian A1 / A2 CEFR only speaking
 ILCE Italian A2 / A2+ / B1 / B1+ / B2 CEFR only speaking
 ILCE Italian B1 / B1+ / B2 / B2+ / C1 CEFR only speaking
 ILCE Italian B2 / B2+ / C1 / C1+ / C2 CEFR only speaking
 ILCE Italian A1 / A2 CEFR only writing
 ILCE Italian A2 / A2+ / B1 / B1+ / B2 CEFR only writing
 ILCE Italian B1 / B1+ / B2 / B2+ / C1 CEFR only writing
 ILCE Italian B2 / B2+ / C1 / C1+ / C2 CEFR only writing
 ILCE Italian A1 / A2 CEFR only listening
 ILCE Italian A2 / A2+ / B1 / B1+ / B2 CEFR only listening
 ILCE Italian B1 / B1+ / B2 / B2+ / C1 CEFR only listening
 ILCE Italian B2 / B2+ / C1 / C1+ / C2 CEFR only listening
 ILCE Italian Tourism and Hotel Sector A1 / A2 / B1 / B2 / C1 CEFR
 ILCE Italian Gastronomy Sector A1 / A2 / B1 / B2 / C1 CEFR

Japanese
Avant STAMP and Place adaptive Japanese assessments utilize actual cultural texts and audio you would encounter in the real world such as articles, advertisements, and news. All Avant Japanese proficiency tests are aligned to the ACTFL Proficiency Guidelines.
JLPT - Japanese Language Proficiency Test (N5, N4, N3, N2, N1) 
NAT-TEST - The Japanese Language NAT-TEST (N5, N4, N3, N2, N1)
BJT - Business Japanese Proficiency Test (ビジネス日本語能力テスト)
EJU - Examination for Japanese University Admission (日本留学試験)
Nihongo Kentei - Overall Japanese language proficiency test（日本語検定）
Japan Proverb Test
J-Test

Japanese Sign Language
 Zenkoku-Shuwa Kentei

Javanese
 Official ACTFL Oral Proficiency Interview (OPI)

Kashimiri
 Official ACTFL Oral Proficiency Interview (OPI)

Kazakh
 KAZTEST
 Official ACTFL Oral Proficiency Interview (OPI)

Klingon
 Klingon Language Institute (Klingon Language Certification Program)

Kikongo-Kongo
 Official ACTFL Oral Proficiency Interview (OPI)

Korean
KPE- Korean proficiency Exam
TOPIK - Test of Proficiency in Korean
 ILCE CEFR Exam System
 ILCE Korean A0+ CEFR
 ILCE Korean A1 / A2 CEFR
 ILCE Korean A1 / A2 / B1 / B2 CEFR
 ILCE Korean A1 / A2 CEFR only speaking
 ILCE Korean A2 / A2+ / B1 / B1+ / B2 CEFR only speaking
 ILCE Korean A1 / A2 CEFR only writing
 ILCE Korean A2 / A2+ / B1 / B1+ / B2 CEFR only writing
 ILCE Korean A1 / A2 CEFR only listening
 ILCE Korean A2 / A2+ / B1 / B1+ / B2 CEFR only listening
 ILCE Korean Tourism and Hotel Sector A1 / A2 / B1 / B2 CEFR
 ACTFL OPIc
 KLAT - Korean Language Ability Test (formerly Korean Language Proficiency Test, or KLPT)

Krio
 Official ACTFL Oral Proficiency Interview (OPI)

Kurdish
 Official ACTFL Oral Proficiency Interview (OPI)

Kurmanji
 Indiana University Bloomberg - Kurmanji Proficiency Testing Project

Kyrgyz
 КЫРГЫЗТЕСТ

Lao (Laotian)
 Official ACTFL Oral Proficiency Interview (OPI)

Latin
AP Latin
Certamen Ciceronianum Arpinas
National Latin Exam
ACTFL Latin Interpretive Reading Assessment

Latvian
State Language Proficiency Certificate in Latvian

Lithuanian
Level Examinations of Language Proficiency for Lithuanian

Luxembourgish
LaF - Diplom Lëtzebuergesch als Friemsprooch

Malay
 The Malay Language Proficiency Certification Test, a.k.a. Sijil Kecekapan Bahasa Melayu Bagi Warganegara Asing (SKBMW), endorsed by The Ministry of Higher Education Malaysia, and governed by Majlis Peperiksaan Malaysia (MPM) a.k.a. Malaysian Examinations Council;
 The Malay Language Entrance Proficiency Test (ML EPT), only applicable for applicants being considered for teaching Malay in Singapore.
 Official ACTFL Oral Proficiency Interview (OPI)

Malayalam
 Official ACTFL Oral Proficiency Interview (OPI)

Mongolian
 Mongolian Language Proficiency Test (MLPT)
The Foreign Language Achievement Testing Service at Brigham Young University offer both BYU and non-BYU students the opportunity to test their ability in the language
 Official ACTFL Oral Proficiency Interview (OPI)

Myanmar (Burmese)
 MLT: Test levels include MB, M1, M2, M3, M4, M5.
 Official ACTFL Oral Proficiency Interview (OPI)

Nepali
 Official ACTFL Oral Proficiency Interview (OPI)

Norwegian
Norsk Språktest - Folkeuniversitetet:
Norskprøve 2 for voksne innvandrere - Level A2;
Norskprøve 3 for voksne innvandrere - Level B1;
Test i norsk - høyere nivå - Advanced Level (Bergenstesten).
 Official ACTFL Oral Proficiency Interview (OPI)
 Bergenstest for voksne innvandrere - Level B2

Pashto
 Indiana University Bloomberg - Pashto Proficiency Testing Project

Persian (Farsi)
 SAMFA Standard Persian Language Proficiency Test
 Ankara University TÖMER Persian course offering levels A1 to C1
 Georgetown University offers proficiency testing in this language for its own students.
 ACTFL OPIc

Polish
 Certificate Examinations in Polish as a Foreign Language. The certificate examinations are staged on three levels of language proficiency:
B1 – basic;
B2 – general intermediate;
C2 – advanced.
ECL - European Consortium for the Certificate of Attainment in Modern Languages
 Official ACTFL Oral Proficiency Interview (OPI)

Portuguese

Brazilian Portuguese
CELPE-Bras - Brazilian Certificate of Proficiency in Portuguese for Foreigners
 Certificados en Lenguas Extranjeras (CLE). Certificate of proficiency in six foreign languages, Portuguese being one of them, issued by the Ministry of Education, City of Buenos Aires (Argentina). Tests the four skills. Targeted at primary and secondary-level students in the City of BA, for whom it is free of charge.
 ACTFL OPIc

European Portuguese
TELC - The European Language Certificates (Portuguese Level B1 only)
CAPLE - Centre for Evaluation of the Portuguese Language (Centro de Avaliação de Português Língua Estrangeira)
ACESSO - Certificado acesso ao português (Level A1)
CIPLE - Certificado inicial de português língua estrangeira (Level A2)
DEPLE - Diploma elementar de português língua estrangeira (Level B1)
DIPLE - Diploma intermédio de português língua estrangeira (Level B2)
DAPLE - Diploma avançado de português língua estrangeira (Level C1)
DUPLE - Diploma universitário de português língua estrangeira (Level C2)
 ACTFL OPIc

Romanian

 Romanian Language Institute (not to be confused with Romanian Cultural Institute)
 Certificat de competență lingvistică
 University of Bucharest
 Certificat CLS ("Centrul de Limbi Străine")
 Babeș-Bolyai University (Cluj-Napoca)
 Atestat de limba română (B2 only)
 ECL Examination System
 Certificat ECL (A2/B1/B2/C1)

Russian
 ILCE CEFR Exam System
 ILCE Russian A0+ CEFR
 ILCE Russian A1 CEFR
 ILCE Russian A1 / A2 CEFR
 ILCE Russian A2 CEFR
 ILCE Russian B1 / B2 CEFR
 ILCE Russian A1 / A2 / B1 / B2 CEFR
 ILCE Russian C1 / C2 CEFR
 ILCE Russian A1 / A2 / B1 / B2 / C1 / C2 CEFR
 ILCE Russian A1 / A2 CEFR only speaking
 ILCE Russian A2 / A2+ / B1 / B1+ / B2 CEFR only speaking
 ILCE Russian B1 / B1+ / B2 / B2+ / C1 CEFR only speaking
 ILCE Russian B2 / B2+ / C1 / C1+ / C2 CEFR only speaking
 ILCE Russian A1 / A2 CEFR only writing
 ILCE Russian A2 / A2+ / B1 / B1+ / B2 CEFR only writing
 ILCE Russian B1 / B1+ / B2 / B2+ / C1 CEFR only writing
 ILCE Russian B2 / B2+ / C1 / C1+ / C2 CEFR only writing
 ILCE Russian A1 / A2 CEFR only listening
 ILCE Russian A2 / A2+ / B1 / B1+ / B2 CEFR only listening
 ILCE Russian B1 / B1+ / B2 / B2+ / C1 CEFR only listening
 ILCE Russian B2 / B2+ / C1 / C1+ / C2 CEFR only listening
 ILCE Russian Tourism and Hotel Sector A1 / A2 / B1 / B2 / C1 CEFR
Test of Russian as a Foreign Language
TELC - The European Language Certificates
 ACTFL OPIc

Serbian
 Nacionalni sertifikat o poznavanju srpskog jezika organised by the Department of Philology of the Univerzitet u Beogradu

Sinhalese
 Official ACTFL Oral Proficiency Interview (OPI)

Slovak
 Certificate of Slovak language proficiency. Levels: A2, B1, B2, C1, C2.
ECL - European Consortium for the Certificate of Attainment in Modern Languages
 Official ACTFL Oral Proficiency Interview (OPI)

Slovene
 Izpit iz znanja slovenščine. Levels: A1 (Breakthrough), A2/B1 (Basic), B2 (Intermediate), C1/C2 (Advanced). Offered by the Department of Philosophy of the Univerza v Ljubljani
 Official ACTFL Oral Proficiency Interview (OPI)

Somali
 Official ACTFL Oral Proficiency Interview (OPI)

Spanish
 SIELE - Servicio Internacional de Evaluación de la Lengua Española
CELA - Certificado de Español como Lengua Adicional del Centro de Enseñanza para Extranjeros (CEPE) de la Universidad Nacional Autónoma de México (UNAM). 3 Levels: Independent Level (B1), Advanced Level (B2) and Proficiency Level (C2)
CELU - Certificado de Español: Lengua y Uso, Certificate of Spanish: Language and use.
Certificado de las Escuelas Oficiales de Idiomas, Spain - Diploma de español, level "Básico" - A2, "Intermedio" - B1, "Avanzado" - B2, C1
DELE - Diplomas de Español como Lengua Extranjera. Levels: A1, A2, B1, B2, C1, C2.
ECL - Consorcio Europeo para el Certificado en Lenguas Modernas
LanguageCert USAL esPro Comprensión auditiva y de lectura
LanguageCert USAL esPro Expresión escrita
LanguageCert USAL esPro Expresión oral
 ACTFL OPIc
 ILCE CEFR Exam System
 ILCE Spanish A0+ CEFR
 ILCE Spanish A1 CEFR
 ILCE Spanish A1 / A2 CEFR
 ILCE Spanish A2 CEFR
 ILCE Spanish B1 / B2 CEFR
 ILCE Spanish A1 / A2 / B1 / B2 CEFR
 ILCE Spanish C1 / C2 CEFR
 ILCE Spanish A1 / A2 / B1 / B2 / C1 / C2 CEFR
 ILCE Spanish A1 / A2 CEFR only speaking
 ILCE Spanish A2 / A2+ / B1 / B1+ / B2 CEFR only speaking
 ILCE Spanish B1 / B1+ / B2 / B2+ / C1 CEFR only speaking
 ILCE Spanish B2 / B2+ / C1 / C1+ / C2 CEFR only speaking
 ILCE Spanish A1 / A2 CEFR only writing
 ILCE Spanish A2 / A2+ / B1 / B1+ / B2 CEFR only writing
 ILCE Spanish B1 / B1+ / B2 / B2+ / C1 CEFR only writing
 ILCE Spanish B2 / B2+ / C1 / C1+ / C2 CEFR only writing
 ILCE Spanish A1 / A2 CEFR only listening
 ILCE Spanish A2 / A2+ / B1 / B1+ / B2 CEFR only listening
 ILCE Spanish B1 / B1+ / B2 / B2+ / C1 CEFR only listening
 ILCE Spanish B2 / B2+ / C1 / C1+ / C2 CEFR only listening
 ILCE Spanish Tourism and Hotel Sector A1 / A2 / B1 / B2 / C1 CEFR
 ILCE Spanish Gastronomy Sector A1 / A2 / B1 / B2 / C1 CEFR
TELC - The European Language Certificates

Spanish Sign Language
 The University of Granada offers a course in Spanish Sign Language The exam consists of two parts:
 Expression (a text for the students to sign)
 Comprehension (a signed video for the students to write up in a Word document)

Swahili (Kiswahili) 
 Official ACTFL Oral Proficiency Interview (OPI)

Swedish
Swedex - Swedex consists of three different levels corresponding to the A2, B1 and B2 levels in the Common European Framework of Reference for Languages. It can be taken in examination centres in twenty-five different countries. Swedex tests the skills of the student in five different areas: vocabulary, grammar, listening, writing and reading.
TISUS - Test in Swedish for University Studies is another certificate, often used as a proof of competence in Swedish to gain access to Swedish universities.
Stockholm Chamber of Commerce Certificate in Business Swedish
Allmänna språkexamina, Ulbildningsstyrelse (Finland)
 Official ACTFL Oral Proficiency Interview (OPI)

Tagalog (Filipino)
 The Foreign Language Achievement Testing Service at Brigham Young University offer both BYU and non-BYU students the opportunity to test their ability in the language by a non-repeatable 80-question exam, the so-called Tagalog Exemption Exam
 Official ACTFL Oral Proficiency Interview (OPI)

Tajik
 Official ACTFL Oral Proficiency Interview (OPI)

Tamil
 AJA Assessment AJA Assessment Tamil Language Proficiency Test in Reading, Writing, Listening & Speaking
 Official ACTFL Oral Proficiency Interview (OPI)

Telugu
 Official ACTFL Oral Proficiency Interview (OPI)

Thai
The Thai Competency Test for foreigners is arranged by the Ministry of Education.
The Chulalongkorn University Proficiency Test of Thai as a Foreign Language (CU-TFL) : CU-TFL is a standardized proficiency test for speakers of Thai as a foreign language designed by the Sirindhorn Thai Language Institute, Chulalongkorn University, located in Bangkok.
TPA  - The School of Language and Culture of the Technology Promotion Association (Thailand-Japan) offers its own Thai proficiency test.
 Official ACTFL Oral Proficiency Interview (OPI).

Tigrinya
 Official ACTFL Oral Proficiency Interview (OPI)

Turkish
 Turkish Proficiency Exam - Türkçe Yeterlik Sınavı (TYS)
UTS - Distance Turkish Test (Uzaktan Türkçe Sınavı)
TELC - The European Language Certificates
 Official ACTFL Oral Proficiency Interview (OPI)

Turkmen
 Official ACTFL Oral Proficiency Interview (OPI)

Uighur/Uyghur
 Official ACTFL Oral Proficiency Interview (OPI)
 Indiana University Bloomberg - Uyghur Proficiency Testing Project

Ukrainian
 Official ACTFL Oral Proficiency Interview (OPI)

Urdu
 Official ACTFL Oral Proficiency Interview (OPI)

Uzbek
 Official ACTFL Oral Proficiency Interview (OPI)

Vietnamese
 VINATEST - Kỳ thi đánh giá năng lực Tiếng Việt (Hanoi University)
 NLTV - Kỳ thi năng lực Tiếng Việt (VNS)
 IVPT - Kỳ Thi Năng Lực Tiếng Việt Quốc Tế (International Vietnamese Proficiency Test) was designed by Center for Vietnamese Studies at National Cheng Kung University (Taiwan) for the speakers of Vietnamese as second language in Taiwan.

Welsh
 WJEC offers Defnyddio'r Gymraeg tests at Mynediad (Entry) level, Sylfaen (Foundation) level, Canolradd (Intermediate) and Uwch (Advanced) level.

Wolof
 Official ACTFL Oral Proficiency Interview (OPI)

Wu
 Official ACTFL Oral Proficiency Interview (OPI)

Yoruba
 Official ACTFL Oral Proficiency Interview (OPI)

Zulu
 Official ACTFL Oral Proficiency Interview (OPI)

References

 
Education-related lists
Visa requirements by nationality
Visa policy by country